Lal Bahadur Thapa is a Nepali politician and a member of the House of Representatives of the federal parliament of Nepal. He was elected under the first-past-the-post system representing CPN UML of the left alliance, in Bajura-1 constituency. He defeated his nearest rival, Kabiraj Pandit of Nepali Congress, by acquiring 28,065 votes to Pandit's 23,181.

References

Living people
Communist Party of Nepal (Unified Marxist–Leninist) politicians
Nepal Communist Party (NCP) politicians
Place of birth missing (living people)
21st-century Nepalese people
Nepal MPs 2017–2022
1967 births